Licia is an Italian feminine given name, and may refer to:

 Licia Albanese (1909–2014), Italian soprano
 Licia Colò (born 1962), Italian journalist
 Licia Maglietta (born 1954), Italian actress
Licia Ronzulli (born 1975), Italian medical worker and politician
 Licia Troisi (born 1980), Italian fantasy writer
 Licia Verde (born 1971), Italian astrophysicist and cosmologist

See also
Livia, an ancient Roman Empress
Lycia, a historical region in Anatolia; sometimes spelled "Licia" in Church Latin

Italian feminine given names